Swimming was part of the first modern Olympic games in 1896 in Athens. In 1908, the world swimming association, Fédération Internationale de Natation (FINA), was formed.

Ancient times 

10,000-year-old rock paintings of people swimming were found in the Cave of Swimmers near Wadi Sura in southwestern Egypt. These pictures seem to show breaststroke or doggy paddle, although it is also possible that the movements have a ritual meaning unrelated to swimming. An Egyptian clay seal dated between 9000 BC and 4000 BC shows four people who are believed to be swimming a variant of the front crawl.

More references to swimming are found in the Babylonian and Assyrian wall drawings, depicting a variant of the breaststroke. The most famous drawings were found in the Kebir desert and are estimated to be from around 4000 BC. The Nagoda bas-relief also shows swimmers inside of men dating back from 3000 BC. The Indian palace Mohenjo Daro from 2800 BC contains a swimming pool sized 12 m by 7 m. The Minoan palace of Knossos in Crete also featured baths. An Egyptian tomb from 2000 BC shows a variant of front crawl. Depictions of swimmers have also been found from the Hittites, Minoans and other Middle Eastern civilizations, in the Tepantitla compound at Teotihuacan, and in mosaics in Pompeii.

Written references date back to ancient times, with the earliest as early as 2000 BC. Such references occur in works like Gilgamesh, the Iliad, the Odyssey, the Bible (Ezekiel 47:5, Acts 27:42, Isaiah 25:11), Beowulf, and other sagas, although the style is never described. There are also many mentions of swimmers in the Vatican, Borgian and Bourbon codices. A series of reliefs from 850 BC in the Nimrud Gallery of the British Museum shows swimmers, mostly in a military context, Often using swimming aids.

Early modern era 

Since swimming was done in a state of undress, it became less popular as society became more conservative in the Early Modern period. Leonardo da Vinci made early sketches of lifebelts. In 1538, Nikolaus Wynmann, a Swiss–German professor of languages, wrote the earliest known complete book about swimming, Colymbetes, sive de arte natandi dialogus et festivus et iucundus lectu (The Swimmer, or A Dialogue on the Art of Swimming and Joyful and Pleasant to Read). His purpose was to reduce the dangers of drowning. The book contained a good methodical approach to learning breaststroke, and mentioned swimming aids such as air-filled cow bladders, reed bundles, and cork belts.

In 1587, Everard Digby also wrote a swimming book, claiming that humans could swim better than fish. Digby was a Senior Fellow at St. John's College, Cambridge and was interested in the scientific method. His short treatise, De arte natandi, was written in Latin and contained over 40 woodcut illustrations depicting various methods of swimming, including the breaststroke, backstroke and crawl. Digby regarded the breaststroke as the most useful form of swimming. In 1603, Emperor Go-Yozei of Japan declared that schoolchildren should swim.

In 1595, Christopher Middleton wrote "A short introduction for to learn to swim", that was the first published guide recording drawings and examples of different swimming styles.

In 1696, the French author Melchisédech Thévenot wrote The Art of Swimming, describing a breaststroke very similar to the modern breaststroke. This book was translated into English and became the standard reference of swimming for many years to come. In 1793, GutsMuths from Schnepfenthal, Germany, wrote Gymnastik für die Jugend (Exercise for youth), including a significant portion about swimming. In 1794, Kanonikus Oronzio de Bernardi of Italy wrote a two volume book about swimming, including floating practice as a prerequisite for swimming studies.

In 1798, GutsMuths wrote another book Kleines Lehrbuch der Schwimmkunst zum Selbstunterricht (Small study book of the art of swimming for self-study), recommending the use of a "fishing rod" device to aid in the learning of swimming. His books describe a three-step approach to learning to swim that is still used today. First, get the student used to the water; second, practice the swimming movements out of the water; and third, practice the swimming movements in the water. He believed that swimming is an essential part of every education. The Haloren, a group of salt makers in Halle, Germany, greatly advanced swimming through setting a good example to others by teaching their children to swim at a very early age.

Swimming as a competitive sport 
Swimming emerged as a competitive sport in the early 1800s in England. In 1828, the first indoor swimming pool, St George's Baths, was opened to the public. By 1837, the National Swimming Society was holding regular swimming competitions in six artificial swimming pools, built around London. The sport grew in popularity and by 1880, when the first national governing body, the Amateur Swimming Association, was formed, there were already over 300 regional clubs in operation across the country.

In 1844 a swimming competition was held in London with the participation of two Native Americans. The British competitor used the traditional breaststroke, while the Native Americans swam a variant of the front crawl, which had been used by people in the Americas for generations, but was not known to the British. The winning medal went to 'Flying Gull' who swam the 130-foot length in 30 seconds – the Native American swimming method proved to be a much faster style than the British breaststroke. The Times of London reported disapprovingly that the Native American stroke was an unrefined motion with the arms "like a windmill" and the chaotic and unregulated kicking of the legs. The considerable splashing that the stroke caused was deemed to be barbaric and "un-European" to the British gentlemen, who preferred to keep their heads over the water. Subsequently, the British continued to swim only breaststroke until 1873. The British did, however, adapt the breaststroke into the speedier sidestroke, where the swimmer lies to one side; this became the more popular choice by the late 1840s. In 1895, J. H. Thayers of England swam  in a record-breaking 1:02.50 using a sidestroke.

Sir John Arthur Trudgen picked up the hand-over stroke from South American natives he observed swimming on a trip to Buenos Aires. On his return to England in 1868, he successfully debuted the new stroke in 1873 and won a local competition in 1875. Although the new stroke was really the reintroduction of a more intuitive method for swimming, one that had been in evidence in ancient cultures such as Ancient Assyria, his method revolutionized the state of competitive swimming – his stroke is still regarded as the most powerful to use today. In his stroke, the arms were brought forward, alternating, while the body rolled from side to side. The kick was a scissors kick such as that familiarly used in breaststroke, with one kick for two arm strokes, although it is believed that the Native Americans had indeed used a flutter kick. Front crawl variants used different ratios of scissor kicks to arm strokes, or alternated with a flutter (up-and-down) kick. The speed of the new stroke was demonstrated by F.V.C. Lane in 1901, swimming  in 1:00.0, an improvement of about ten seconds compared to the breaststroke record. Due to its speed the Trudgen became very quickly popular around the world, despite all the ungentleman-like splashing.

Captain Matthew Webb was the first man to swim the English Channel (between England and France), in 1875. He used breaststroke, swimming  in 21 hours and 45 minutes. His feat was not replicated or surpassed for the next 36 years, until Bill Burgess made the crossing in 1911. Other European countries also established swimming federations; Germany in 1882, France in 1890 and Hungary in 1896. The first European amateur swimming competitions were in 1889 in Vienna. The world's first women's swimming championship was held in Scotland in 1892.

Nancy Edberg popularized women's swimming in Stockholm from 1847. She made swimming lessons accessible for both sexes and later introduced swimming lessons for women in Denmark and Norway. Her public swimming exhibitions from 1856 with her students were likely among the first public exhibitions of women swimming in Europe

In 1897, Capt. Henry Sheffield designed a rescue can or rescue cylinder, now well known as the lifesaving device. The pointed ends made it slide faster through the water, although it can cause injuries.

Olympic era 

The Olympic Games were held in 1896 in Athens, a male-only competition. Six events were planned for the swimming competition, but only four events were actually contested: 100 m, 500 m, and 1200 m freestyle and 100 m for sailors. The first gold medal was won by Alfréd Hajós of Hungary in the 100 m freestyle. Hajós was also victorious in the 1200 m event, and was unable to compete in the 500 m, which was won by Austrian Paul Neumann.

The second Olympic games in Paris in 1900 featured 200 m, 1000 m, and 4000 m freestyle, 200 m backstroke, and a 200 m team race (see also Swimming at the 1900 Summer Olympics). There were two additional unusual swimming events (although common at the time): an obstacle swimming course in the Seine river (swimming with the current), and an underwater swimming race. The 4000 m freestyle was won by John Arthur Jarvis in under one hour, the longest Olympic swimming race until the 10k marathon swim was introduced in 2008. The backstroke was also introduced to the Olympic Games in Paris, as was water polo. The Osborne Swimming Club from Manchester beat club teams from Belgium, France and Germany quite easily.

The Trudgen stroke was improved by Australian-born Richmond Cavill. Cavill, whose father Frederick Cavill narrowly failed to swim the English Channel, is credited with developing the stroke after observing a young boy from the Solomon Islands. Cavill and his brothers spread the Australian crawl to England, New Zealand and America.

These games differentiated between breaststroke and freestyle, so that there were now two defined styles (breaststroke and backstroke) and freestyle, where most people swam Trudgen. These games also featured a competition to plunge for distance, where the distance without swimming, after jumping in a pool, was measured.

In 1908, the world swimming association Fédération Internationale de Natation Amateur (FINA) was formed.

Women were first allowed to swim in the 1912 Summer Olympics in Stockholm, competing in freestyle races. In the 1912 games, Harry Hebner of the United States won the 100 m backstroke. At these games Duke Kahanamoku from Hawaii won the 100 m freestyle, having learned the six kicks per cycle front crawl from older natives of his island. This style is now considered the classical front crawl style. The men's competitions were 100 m, 400 m, and 1500 m freestyle, 100 m backstroke, 200 m and 400 m breaststroke, and four by 200 m freestyle relay. The women's competitions were 100 m freestyle and four by 100 m freestyle relay.

The Deutsche Lebens-Rettungs-Gesellschaft (DLRG) (German lifesaving organization) was established on October 19, 1913 in Leipzig after 17 people drowned while trying to board the cruise steamer Kronprinz Wilhelm. In the same year the first elastic swimsuit was made by the sweater company Jantzen.

In 1922, Johnny Weissmuller became the first person to swim the 100 m in less than a minute, using a six kicks per cycle Australian crawl. Johnny Weissmuller started the golden age of swimming, winning five Olympic medals and 36 national championships and never losing a race in his ten-year career, until he retired from swimming and started his second career starring as Tarzan in film. His record of 51 seconds in  freestyle stood for over 17 years. In the same year, Sybil Bauer was the first woman to break a men's world record over the 440 m backstroke in 6:24.8.

At the 1924 Summer Olympics in Paris, lane dividers made of cork were used for the first time, and lines on the pool bottom aided with orientation.

Swimming innovation 

The scientific study of swimming began in 1928 with David Armbruster, a coach at the University of Iowa, who filmed swimmers underwater. The Japanese also used underwater photography to research the stroke mechanics, and subsequently dominated the 1932 Summer Olympics. Armbruster also researched a problem of breaststroke where the swimmer was slowed down significantly while bringing the arms forward underwater. In 1934 Armbruster refined a method to bring the arms forward over water in breaststroke. While this "butterfly" technique was difficult, it brought a great improvement in speed. One year later, in 1935, Jack Sieg, a swimmer also from the University of Iowa developed a technique involving swimming on his side and beating his legs in unison similar to a fish tail, and modified the technique afterward to swim it face down. Armbruster and Sieg combined these techniques into a variant of the breaststroke called butterfly with the two kicks per cycle being called dolphin fishtail kick. Using this technique Sieg swam  in 1:00.2. However, even though this technique was much faster than regular breaststroke, the dolphin fishtail kick violated the rules and was not allowed. Therefore, the butterfly arms with a breaststroke kick were used by a few swimmers in the 1936 Summer Olympics in Berlin for the breaststroke competitions. In 1938, almost every breaststroke swimmer was using this butterfly style, yet this stroke was considered a variant of the breaststroke until 1952, when it was accepted as a separate style with a set of rules.

Around that time another modification to the backstroke became popular. Previously, the arms were held straight during the underwater push phase, for example by the top backstroke swimmer from 1935 to 1945, Adolph Kiefer. However, Australian swimmers developed a technique where the arms are bent underwater, increasing the horizontal push and the resulting speed and reducing the wasted force upward and sideways. This style is now generally used worldwide.

In 1935 topless swimsuits for men were worn for the first time during an official competition. In 1943, the US ordered the reduction of fabric in swimsuits by 10% due to wartime shortages, resulting in the first two piece swimsuits. Shortly afterwards the bikini was invented in Paris by Louis Reard (officially) or Jacques Heim (earlier, but slightly larger).

Another modification was developed for breaststroke. In breaststroke, breaking the water surface increases the friction, reducing the speed of the swimmer. Therefore, swimming underwater increases the speed. This led to a controversy at the 1956 Summer Olympics in Melbourne, and six swimmers were disqualified as they repeatedly swam long distances underwater between surfacing to breathe. The rule was changed to require breaststroke to be swum at the surface starting with the first surfacing after the start and after each turn. However, one Japanese swimmer, Masaru Furukawa, circumvented the rule by not surfacing at all after the start, but swimming as much of the lane underwater as possible before breaking the surface. He swam all but 5 meters underwater for the first three 50 meter laps, and also swam half of the last lap underwater, winning the gold medal. The adoption of this technique led to many swimmers suffering from oxygen starvation or even some swimmers passing out during the race due to a lack of air, and a new breaststroke rule was introduced by FINA, additionally limiting the distance that can be swum underwater after the start and every turn, and requiring the head to break the surface every cycle. The 1956 Games in Melbourne also saw the introduction of the flip turn, a sort of tumble turn to faster change directions at the end of the lane.

In 1972, another famous swimmer, Mark Spitz, was at the height of his career. During the 1972 Summer Olympics in Munich, Germany, he won seven gold medals. Shortly thereafter in 1973, the first swimming world championship was held in Belgrade, Yugoslavia by the FINA.

Breaking the water surface reduces the speed in swimming. The swimmers Daichi Suzuki (Japan) and David Berkoff (America) used this for the 100 meter backstroke at the 1988 Summer Olympics in Seoul. Berkoff swam 33 meters of the first lane completely underwater using only a dolphin kick, far ahead of his competition. A sports commentator called this a Berkoff Blastoff. Suzuki, having practiced the underwater technique for 10 years, surfaced only a little bit earlier, winning the race in 55.05. At that time, this was not restricted by FINA backstroke rules. The backstroke rules were quickly changed in the same year by the FINA to ensure the health and safety of the swimmers, limiting the underwater phase after the start to ten meters, which was expanded to 15 meters in 1991. In Seoul, Kristin Otto from East Germany won six gold medals, the most ever won by a woman.

Another innovation is the use of flip turns for backstroke. According to the rules, a backstroke swimmer had to touch the wall while lying less than 90 degrees out of the horizontal. Some swimmers discovered that they could turn faster if they rolled almost 90 degrees sideways, touched the wall, and made a forward tumble turn, pushing off the wall on their backs. The FINA has changed the rules to allow the swimmers to turn over completely before touching the wall to simplify this turn and to improve the speed of the races.

Similarly, the dolphin-kick underwater swimming technique is now also used for butterfly. Consequently, in 1998 FINA introduced a rule limiting swimmers to 15 meters underwater per lap before they must surface. After underwater swimming for freestyle and backstroke, the underwater swimming technique is now also used for butterfly, for example by Denis Pankratov (Russia) or Angela Kennedy (Australia), swimming large distances underwater with a dolphin kick. FINA is again considering a rule change for safety reasons. It is faster to do butterfly kick underwater for the first few meters off the wall than swimming at the surface. In 2005, FINA declared that you may take 1 underwater dolphin kick in the motion of a breaststroke pull-out.

Sophisticated bodyskins were banned from FINA competitions from the start of 2010 after many national swimming federations demanded the action, and leading athletes such as Michael Phelps and Rebecca Adlington criticized the suits.

See also 

 History of Swimwear
 Aquatic ape hypothesis
 History of water supply and sanitation
 List of swimming competitions
 Swimming at the Summer Olympics

References 

History of swimming
Swimming